Rao Jodha Rathore(28 March 1416 – 6 April 1489) was a ruler of Mandore in the present-day state of Rajasthan. He was the son of Rao Ranmal (Rao Ridmal) of the Rathore clan. He is known for his illustrious military career and for founding the city of Jodhpur in 1459.

Ancestry
Rao Ranmal secured the throne of Mandore in 1427. In addition to ruling Mandore, Rao Ranmal also became the administrator of Mewar to assist Maharana Mokal (father of Rana Kumbha). After the assassination of Maharana Mokal by two brothers (Chacha and Mera) in 1433, Ranmal continued as administrator of Mewar at the side of Rana Kumbha.

Early years
After Rana Kumbha assassinated Rao Jodha's father Rao Ranmal, Rao Jodha escaped Mewar with his men. Approximately 700 horsemen accompanied Rao Jodha from Chittor. Fighting near Chittor and a valiant attempt to bar the pursuers at Someshwar Pass resulted in heavy losses amongst Jodha's warriors. When Jodha reached Mandore he had only seven people accompanying him. Jodha collected whatever forces he could, abandoned Mandore and pressed on towards Jangalu.  Jodha barely managed to reach safety at Kahuni (a village near present-day Bikaner).

Marwar - Mewar War
For 15 years, Jodha tried in vain to recapture Mandore. Jodha's opportunity to strike finally came in 1453 with Rana Kumbha facing simultaneous attacks by the Sultans of Malwa and Gujarat. Jodha made a surprise attack on Mandore using horses seized from the Thakur of Setrawa and other jagirdars. Jodha's forces overwhelmed the defenders and captured Mandore with relative ease. Jodha then successively captured Gogunda, Chaukade, Sojat, Merta, Bahirunda and Kosana(Rishi Dadhichi's origin). Rana Kumbha did make attempts to recapture these territories, albeit unsuccessfully. Jodha and Kumbha eventually settled their differences in order to face their common enemies, the rulers of Malwa and Gujarat.

Coronation as Rao (1439 AD) 
Source:

Due to weakening of Rathore power after the Sisodia assault on Mandore, Rathore chiefs set aside their internal feuds and rallied under the banner of Jodha. At Kavani, Rathore clansmen collectively decided to declare Jodha as Rao, and successor to Rao Ranmal, and the succeeding day was fixed for the Raj-Tilak. Rao Jodha sent emissaries to Deshnoke to request Karni Mata to grace the occasion and herself apply the Tilak. She was unable to come and instead sent Pugree Dastoor to Kavani with her sons and Jaggu Doshi.

Therefore, on Kartik Vadi 5th of Samvat 1496 (1439 AD), Jodha was put on the Rathore throne and declared the Rao. On the request of the assemblage, Karniji's son Punya Raj, on her behalf, performed the ceremony and applied the Raj-Tilak. Punya Raj gave five leaves of Jhadberi as Karniji's gift which Jodha respectfully put in the Pugree that he had received from Karniji.

Recapture of Mandore (1453 AD) 
Source:

Mandore was occupied by Sisodia forces and on behalf of Maharana of Mewar, Narbad (son of Rao Satta) was stationed there with a strong garrison at Mandore with orders to pursue and destroy Jodha. For the next 12 years, Narbad would relentlessly devise ways to draw out and capture Jodha. He would often deliberately leave his flanks exposed and even leave the route to Mandore ill-defended in the hope enticing Jodha to attack in the open. But Karniji had forewarned Rao Jodha. She had told him not to risk a major battle until she gave an all clear. Thus forewarned, Rao Jodha bided his time at Kavani for 12 years.

One day in Samvat 1510 (1453 AD), Karniji sent a message to Rao Jodha asking him to promptly reach Deshnoke with as many Rathores as he could muster. Accordingly, he reached Deshnoke and appearing before Karniji sought advice and directions. Karniji told him that the opprtune time for invading Mandore had arrived and he must march with his men towards Mandore.

During the way to Mandore, Jodha camped at the hamlet of Modhi Moolani in village Sirdan. Here, Jodha was served affectionately by Modhi with halwa dish. The Modhi told him, "Don’t worry. I put some majith to make up for the shortage of maida. This auspicious hue on your mustache is a sure sign of Karniji’s blessings. Your victory is certain. Proceed at once to Mandore."

Jodha next camped at Bengati where Harbuji Sankhla, one of the five well-known holy men of Rajasthan, played host. Jodha and his men were offered bajra khichri by the saint. While departing, Harbuji told Jodha he will suffer no defeat so long as he has Sri Karniji's blessings and that he shall reconquer his heritage. Thus Jodha proceeded accepting assistance from chiefs of estates and villages falling on the route.

Jodha arrived near Mandore with a contingent of 700 horses and 10,000 foot soldiers where with the assistance of Kalu Mangalia, who was Jodha's confidant and worked as an insider for the enemy, was able to enter with 1000 of men in the citadel. These men let inside the rest of the army in the night and stormed the fort from within. This took the Sisodias and their Rathore supporters by surprise and by sunrise Jodha took over Mandore.

Nearest remaining outpost of Sisodias, Chokri was attacked by Rao Kandhal (brother of Rao Jodha) the following day. Rao Kandhal then marched an army on Merta and Ajmer which he conquered in the course of year, Samvat 1510 (1453 AD). Thus, Rao Jodha was able to reconquer his inhertitance & restrengthened the Rathores in Marwar.

Legend about capture of Mandore
Once, late at night, Rao Jodha stopped at a farmers house. They did not recognize who he was. He was given a bowl of hot khichdi, an Indian stew. Jodha put his fingers in the centre of the bowl and burnt his fingers. The farmer's wife commented, "Stranger, you are making the same mistake as our king (Jodha) is.  Khichdi is hottest in the centre and coolest at the edge". This prompted Jodha to stop worrying about Mandore and just focus on outlying forts, which he managed to win with ease. In due time he captured Mandore. After Mandore was taken, Jodha's elder brother Akheraj declared Jodha the King of Marwar, made a cut on his thumb and with his blood, performed Jodha's tilak. Since then, after death of the King, Bagri Thakur (Jagir of descendant of Akheraj) has made the tilak of the new King of Jodhpur.

Later conquests
The Delhi Sultanate took advantage of Rao Jodha's war with Rana Kumbha and captured several Rathore strongholds including Nagaur, Jhalor and Siwana. Rao Jodha formed an alliance with several Rajput clans including the Deora's and Bhati's and attacked the Delhi army, he succeeded in capturing Merta, Phalodi, Pokran, Bhadrajun, Sojat, Jaitaran, Siwana, Nagaur and Godwar from the Delhi Sultanate. These areas were permanently captured from Delhi and became a part of Marwar. The most powerful Kingdom in Rajputana.

According to Nainsi's Vigat (Marwar ra parganam ri vigat) the rulers of Jalore and Bundi submitted to Rao Jodha. Ajmer and Sambhar were ceded to Jodha by Rana Kumbha's son, Udaysimha (Udaysingh I). The ruler of Mohilavati, Ajit Singh died in a battle with Rao Jodha's forces and the city was captured some years later. After settling down in the aforementioned village of Kahuni, Jodha's son Bika founded the kingdom of Bikaner. Rao Jodha thus laid the foundation of the powerful Jodhpur State.

Foundation of Jodhpur

A holy man sensibly advised Rao Jodha to move the capital to hilltop safety. By 1459, it became evident that a more secure headquarters was required. Chidia-tunk, a high rocky ridge, nine km to the south of Mandore was an obvious choice for the new city of Jodhpur. The natural elevation was enhanced by a fortress of staggering proportions, to which Rao Jodha's successors added over the centuries. Jodhpur was on the important Delhi to Gujarat trade route and it greatly benefited from the trade of silk, opium, sandalwood, copper and other items.  The Mehrangarh Fort, situated on a 125 m high hill, is among the most impressive and formidable forts in Rajasthan. The construction of the fort was begun by Maharaja Rao Jodha in 1459 and was improvised by Maharaja Jaswant Singh (1637–1680).

The fort originally had seven gates ("pols"). There is a first gate with spikes to prevent attack from elephants. The Fatehpol or victory gate was erected by Maharaja Ajit Singh in 1707 to commemorate his victory over the Mughals. The other gates include the Jai Pol, built by Maharaja Man Singh in 1806, following his victory over the armies of Jaipur and Bikaner.

Jodha's mother Koram de built KodamdeSar (now in Bikaner) Pond.
Jodha's wife Rani Hadi Jasmade built Ranisar tank, which is now within walls of Mehrangarh fort.
Rani Sonagri Chand Kanwar built a Baori, called Chand Baori

Death and the succession
Rao Jodha died on 6 April 1489, aged 73. The death of Rao Jodha was followed by a struggle for succession amongst his sons. He was succeeded by his son Rao Satal (1489–1491). After his death, his brother Rao Suja (1491–1515) occupied the throne.

See also
 Jodhpur State
 Rulers of Marwar
 Panch Mahal Maroth
 Jiliya alias Abhaypura
 List of Rajputs
 Rao Nara

References

 Sharma, Dasharatha (1970). Lectures on Rajput History and Culture, Delhi:Motilal Banarsidass.

Monarchs of Marwar
1416 births
1489 deaths
15th-century Indian monarchs
Indian city founders